Kirk House can refer to:

In the United States ordered by state
 Bartlett-Kirk House, listed on the National Register of Historic Places (NRHP) in Batesville, Arizona
Col. Edward N. Kirk House, listed on the NRHP in Sterling, Illinois
Sennett and Bertha Kirk House, listed on the NRHP in Garnett, Kansas
Elisha Kirk House, listed on the NRHP in Calvert, Maryland
 Kirk House (Narrowsburg, New York), listed on the NRHP in Sullivan County, New York
John W. and Thomas F. Kirk House, listed on the NRHP in St. Paul, Oregon
William Kirk House, listed on the NRHP in Turbotville, Pennsylvania
Kirk's Cabin Complex, listed on the NRHP in Moab, Utah
Lilly Kirk House, listed on the NRHP in Bothell, Washington